The 1986 Tennessee gubernatorial election was held on November 4, 1986. Democratic nominee Ned McWherter defeated Republican nominee Winfield Dunn with 54.3% of the vote.

Primary elections
Primary elections were held on August 7, 1986.

Democratic primary

Candidates
Ned McWherter, Speaker of the Tennessee House of Representatives
Jane Eskind, Public Service Commissioner
Richard Fulton, Mayor of Nashville
Joseph L. Crichton
Bill Jacox

Results

Republican primary

Candidates
Winfield Dunn, former Governor
Hubert David Patty, perennial candidate
Charles Gordon Vick, perennial candidate

Results

General election

Candidates
Ned McWherter, Democratic
Winfield Dunn, Republican

Results

References

1986
Tennessee
Gubernatorial